Wendel da Silva Ramos (born 1 April 2001), known as Wendel, is a Brazilian professional footballer who plays as a central midfielder for Ukrainian Premier League club Metalist 1925 Kharkiv.

References

External links
 
 

2001 births
Living people
People from Limeira
Brazilian footballers
Association football midfielders
Esporte Clube XV de Novembro (Piracicaba) players
FC Vovchansk players
FC Metalist 1925 Kharkiv players
Ukrainian Second League players
Brazilian expatriate footballers
Expatriate footballers in Ukraine
Brazilian expatriate sportspeople in Ukraine